The list of ship launches in 1926 includes a chronological list of ships launched in 1926.

References

Sources

1926
Ship launches
 
1926-related lists